Pisokal is a former village in Municipality of Prilep, North Macedonia.

Villages in Prilep Municipality